Sparna nigrolineata is a species of beetle in the family Cerambycidae. It was described by Ernst Fuchs in 1956. It is known from Colombia.

References

Colobotheini
Beetles described in 1956